Gwion, or Taliesin, was an early Brythonic poet of Sub-Roman Britain.

Gwion may also refer to:
 Gwion Edwards (born 1993), Welsh footballer
 Gwion Hallam, Welsh writer and television presenter

See also 
 Gwion Gwion, a rock art tradition of Australia
 Guion (disambiguation)
 Gweon, alternative spelling of the Korean name Kwon